The Men's Shot Put athletics events for the 2016 Summer Paralympics took place at the Rio Olympic Stadium from September 8 to September 17, 2016. A total of 14 events are contested incorporating 17 different classifications.

Schedule

Medal summary

Results

F12
Incorporating F11.

F20

F32

The Men's shot put F32 was contested as a straight final on September 8, 2016. 12 athletes, representing 8 nations, took part in the final

F33

F34

F35
This event took place on Sunday 11 September 2016 at 10:04, local time

F36

F37

F40

F41

F42

F53

F55 (incorporating F54)

F57 (incorporating F56)

References

Athletics at the 2016 Summer Paralympics
2016 in men's athletics